The Department of Appointment and Personnel (DoAP) is a department of Government of Uttar Pradesh. The Department of Appointment is responsible for the matters related to transfer posting, training, foreign  assignment, Foreign training and compliant  monitoring and settlement for the Indian Administrative Service (IAS), the Provincial Civil Service (PCS) and the Provincial Civil Service-Judicial (only after consulting Allahabad High Court), whereas, the Department of Personnel provides opinion to the Department of Secretariat Administration and other departments in the matter of condition of service and regulation for recruitment to the subordinate services.

The Chief Minister of Uttar Pradesh serves as the departmental minister, and the Additional Chief Secretary (Appointment and Personnel), an IAS officer, is the administrative head of the department.

Functions 
The Department of Appointment and Personnel is responsible for forming and the regulating of the service rules-related rules and regulations for government officers. The department answers questions in the legislative assembly and the legislative council, addresses issues related to the policies and norms—as laid down by it—are followed by all departments in the recruitment, regulation of service conditions, transfer-posting and deputation of personnel and other related issues. It is also responsible for  framing  of  policy  and  giving  advise  in  the  matter of appointment in civil service of ex-armed forces personnel and combined competitive examination of different services.

The personnel department is also looking after the departmental examination of officers, constitutions of subordinated service board and there related regulations. The department is also the cadre controlling authority of the Indian Administrative Service and the Provincial Civil Service.

The Allahabad High Court exercises effective control over Higher Judicial Service and Provincial Civil Service-Judicial officers. The power of postings transfers, leave, crossing of efficiency bar, rant of pension in respect of all the officers and promoting munsifs as civil judges is also vested in the high court by virtue of Article 235 of the Constitution of India.

Organisations

DoAP supervises and controls the following organisations, namely - 
 Uttar Pradesh Public Service Commission
 Uttar Pradesh Subordinate Services Selection Commission
Uttar Pradesh Academy of Administration and Management

Important officials 
The Chief Minister of Uttar Pradesh, Yogi Adityanath, is the minister responsible for Department of Appointment and Personnel.

The department's administration is headed by the Additional Chief Secretary, who is an IAS officer, who is assisted by two Special Secretaries, four Joint Secretaries, and nine Deputy/Under Secretaries. The current Additional Chief Secretary (DoAP) is Dr.Deepak Trivedi.

Secretariat level

Head of department level

References 

Appointment and Personnel